North Winfield Creek is a river in Herkimer County in the U.S. State of New York. It starts in an unnamed field by the Hamlet of Days Corners and flows generally southward before converging with the Unadilla River in the Village of West Winfield.

References

Rivers of New York (state)
Rivers of Herkimer County, New York